This is a list of the Danish Singles Chart number-one hits of 1989 from the International Federation of the Phonographic Industry and Nielsen Marketing Research. They were provided through Music & Media magazine under the "Top 10 Sales In Europe" section.

Chart history

References

1989 in Denmark
Denmark
Lists of number-one songs in Denmark